Neva Left is the fifteenth studio album by American rapper Snoop Dogg. It was released on May 19, 2017, for digital download and July 7, 2017, for purchase on CD, by Doggystyle Records and Empire Distribution. Snoop Dogg also enlisted a variety of guest vocalists including Redman, Method Man, B-Real, KRS-One, and frequent collaborators Charlie Wilson and Wiz Khalifa, among others. Meanwhile, production was handled by Dr. Evo, DJ Battlecat, Musik MajorX, League Of Starz, and Rick Rock, among others.

Background
The album's release date and artwork was unveiled on April 24, 2017. The cover features a 1992 photograph of Snoop Dogg standing beside a California State Route 187 road sign. This is a reference to the California penal code.

Promotion

Singles
"Promise You This" was released on March 1, 2017 as the first single. "Lavender (Nightfall Remix)", a remix of "Lavender" by BADBADNOTGOOD also featuring Kaytranada, followed as the second single on March 12, 2017 with an accompanying music video.
"Mount Kushmore" featuring Redman, Method Man, and B-Real, was made available for purchase as the third single on April 25, 2017, along with the pre-order of the album.

Commercial performance 
Neva Left  debuted at number 54 on the Billboard 200, with over 11,000 album-equivalent units. It was the 13th best-selling digital album of the week.

Track listing
Credits, Samples and Notes all adapted from the booklet.

Notes
"420 (Blaze Up)" contains additional vocals by Shon Lawon
"Let Us Begin" contains additional vocals by Janice Freeman
"Mount Kushmore" features vocals by Steven J. Collins using a Talk box
"Vapors (DJ Battlecat Remix)" features vocals by FatBoy SSE
"I'm Still Here" features vocals by Kendrick Lamar

Sample credits
"Neva Left" contains samples of "As Long As I've Got You" performed by The Charmels, written by David Porter and Isaac Hayes.
"Bacc in da Dayz" contains a portion of the composition and samples of "Check the Rhime" performed by A Tribe Called Quest, written by Minnie Riperton, Richard Rudolph, Leon Ware, Ali Shaheed Jones-Muhammad, Kamaal Ibn John Fareed, Malik Izaak Taylor, Owen Mcintyre, Malcolm Duncan, Roger Ball, James Stuart, Steve Ferrone and Alan Gorrie.
"Let Us Begin" contains interpolations from "My Philosophy" performed by KRS-One, written by Lawrence Parker.
"Vapors (DJ Battlecat Remix)" embodies the composition "Vapors" performed by Biz Markie, written by Antonio Hardy, Marlon Williams and Marcel Hall.
"Still Here" contains samples of "I'm Still Here" performed by The Notations, written by Cliff Curry.
"Love Around the World" contains a sample from the recording of "When I'm with You" performed by Brenda Lee Eager, written by Larry Mizell.

Charts

See also
 2017 in hip hop music

References

Snoop Dogg albums
Doggystyle Records albums
2017 albums
Empire Distribution albums
Albums produced by BadBadNotGood
Albums produced by Kaytranada
Albums produced by Mars (record producer)
Albums produced by Rick Rock